was a Japanese film director. He directed films from 1930s to 1960s. His older brother, Tomotaka Tasaka (田坂具隆), was also a Japanese film director.

Filmography 
Katsuhiko Tasaka directed over 40 films:

 The Great White Tiger Platoon (1954)
 Fighting Birds (1956)
 Flowery Hood (1956)
 Flowery Hood 2 (1956)
 The Renyasai Yagyu Hidden Story (1956)
 Ghost Cat of Yonaki Swamp (1957)
 Tōkaidō no yarō domo (1958)

References

External links 
 

1914 births
1979 deaths
Japanese film directors
People from Hiroshima